Emmy Karolina Fyhring-Ljungberg (née Storm; 20 May 1925 – 24 November 2014), known professionally as Emy Storm, was a Swedish actress best known for her role as Alma, the mother of Emil i Lönneberga. Storm was married to actor Göte Fyhring (1929-2021).

Biography
Emmy Karolina Storm was born at Alfta, Hälsingland, in 1925 and grew up in a forester-family. When she was 15 years old, she went to Stockholm and worked as maid and waitress. Already interested in acting, she became an actress a few years later. After one performance , the chief of Nordiska Kompaniet, Ragnar Sachs, hired her to work at the studio of Gösta Terserus, after which she appeared in films and on stage.

After studying at Dramatens elevskola, she obtained a position at Riksteatern, where she worked until 1956, when she started working at Östgötateatern. After working at the Royal Dramatic Theatre she worked at Malmö City Theatre from 1962-83. Emy Storm died after suffering a stroke on 24 November 2014; she was 89 years old, and survived by her son, Jonas Fyhring-Ljungberg.

Selected filmography
 2005 - Wallander – Mörkret
 2002 - The Fifth Woman (TV)
 2001 - Fru Marianne (TV)
 2000 - Ronny & Julia (TV)
 1996 - Mysteriet på Greveholm (TV)
 1991 - The Best Intentions (TV)
 1986 - Bödeln och skökan
 1981 - Rasmus på luffen
 1981 - Operation Leo
 1980 - Sverige åt svenskarna
 1978 - Hedebyborna (TV)
 1971–73 - Emil i Lönneberga
 1967 - Kullamannen
 1964 - Dear John
 1963 - Raven's End
 1955 - Getting Married
 1955 - People of the Finnish Forests
 1953 - The Road to Klockrike
 1953 - Ursula, the Girl from the Finnish Forests
 1953 - All the World's Delights
 1952 - Hon kom som en vind
 1951 - In the Arms of the Sea 
 1950 - Andersson's Kalle 
 1948 - Banketten

References

External links
 
 Profile, sfi.se; accessed 24 November 2014. 

 Last interview with Emy Storm (Swedish)

1925 births
2014 deaths
Swedish film actresses
Swedish stage actresses
Swedish television actresses
Place of death missing
People from Hälsingland
20th-century Swedish actresses
21st-century Swedish actresses